Annie Johnston may refer to:

People 
Annie Fellows Johnston (1863–1931), American author
Velma Bronn Johnston (1912–1977), American animal rights activist known as Wild Horse Annie

Ships 
, a Swedish container ship in service 1969-86

See also
Anne Johnston (disambiguation)
Annie Johnson (disambiguation)

Johnston, Annie